Thulasi (Kannada: ತುಳಸಿ) is a 1976 Indian Kannada film, directed and produced by K. S. L. Swamy. The film stars Kalyan Kumar, Jayanthi, Srinath and Manjula in the lead roles. The film has musical score by Vijaya Bhaskar.

Cast
Kalyan Kumar
Jayanthi
Srinath
Manjula
S. Shivaram

References

External links

1976 films
1970s Kannada-language films
Films scored by Vijaya Bhaskar
Films directed by K. S. L. Swamy